Anatoliy Dovhal (complete name Anatoliy Ivanovych Dovhal'; original name: Анатолій Іванович Довгаль) (born 29 January 1976) is a Ukrainian sprinter, who specializes in the 100 metres.

Dovdal won a bronze medal in 60 metres at the 2002 European Indoor Athletics Championships. His personal best time over this distance is 6.56 seconds.

In 100 m he won the 1999 Military World Games and competed at the 2000 Olympics. His personal best time is 10.17 seconds, achieved in June 2004 in Kyiv.

He won the gold medal in 4 x 100 metres relay at the 2002 European Championships.

References

External links

1976 births
Living people
Ukrainian male sprinters
Athletes (track and field) at the 2000 Summer Olympics
Olympic athletes of Ukraine
European Athletics Championships medalists